Roja Municipality is a former municipality in Courland, Latvia. The municipality was formed in 2009 by merging Mērsrags parish and Roja parish the administrative centre being Roja. Since 2010 a separate Mērsrags municipality has been created. The population in 2020 was 3,368.

On 1 July 2021, Roja Municipality ceased to exist and its territory was merged into Talsi Municipality.

See also 
 Administrative divisions of Latvia (2009)

References 

 
Former municipalities of Latvia